Clinoceratidae is an extinct family of actively mobile carnivorous cephalopod of the order Orthocerida that lived in what would be North America and Europe during the middle Ordovician through Early Silurian from 466–443.7 mya, existing for approximately .

Taxonomy
Clinoceratidae was named by Flower (1946). Its type is Clinoceras. It was assigned to Michelinoceratida by Flower (1962).

Morphology
The shell is usually long, and may be straight ("orthoconic") or gently curved.  In life, these animals may have been similar to the modern squid, except for the long shell.

References

 Fossils (Smithsonian Handbooks) by David Ward

Ordovician cephalopods
Silurian cephalopods
Ordovician cephalopods of Europe
Ordovician cephalopods of North America
Silurian cephalopods of North America
Silurian animals of Europe
Darriwilian first appearances
Silurian extinctions
Orthocerida